The Ratties is a British animated series about a family of six rats who live in the wall of a country house. The rats try to emulate the human family who own the house.

The idea for The Ratties was conceived by Laura Milligan, daughter of comedian Spike Milligan. Laura Milligan and Mike Wallis developed the idea into a series of animated shorts; Wallis served as director and producer. Spike Milligan narrated the series with much of the narration ad libbed.

ITV aired 26 episodes in 1988; each episode is under five minutes in length. The series was repeated by ITV from 1991 to 1994.

Characters
The eldest rats in the Ratty family are Uncle Matty and Aunt Hatty (the matron of the family who does all the housework). Tatty is an ambitious rat of the younger generation. The Fatty Brothers are playful and mischievous identical twins. Baby Batty is a child genius.

The Ratties share their home with Spatty, a spider who sometimes gets involved in the Ratties' adventures.

Episodes

References

External links
 

1988 British television series debuts
1988 British television series endings
1980s British children's television series
British children's animated comedy television series
Animated television series about mice and rats
ITV children's television shows
Television series by ITV Studios
English-language television shows
Television shows produced by Central Independent Television